The martini is a cocktail made with gin and vermouth, and garnished with an olive or a lemon twist. Over the years, the martini has become one of the best-known mixed alcoholic beverages. A popular variation, the vodka martini, uses vodka instead of gin for the cocktail's base.

Preparation
By 1922 the martini reached its most recognizable form in which London dry gin and dry vermouth are combined at a ratio of 2:1, stirred in a mixing glass with ice cubes, with the optional addition of orange or aromatic bitters, then strained into a chilled cocktail glass. Over time the generally expected garnish became the drinker's choice of a green olive or a twist of lemon peel.

A dry martini is made with little to no vermouth. Ordering a martini "extra dry" will result in even less or no vermouth added.  By the Roaring Twenties, it became a common drink order. Over the course of the 20th century, the amount of vermouth steadily dropped. During the 1930s the ratio was 3:1 (gin to vermouth), and during the 1940s the ratio was 4:1. During the latter part of the 20th century, 5:1 or 6:1 dry martinis became considered the norm. Drier variations can go to 8:1, 12:1, 15:1 (the "Montgomery", after British Field Marshal Bernard Montgomery's supposed penchant for attacking only when in possession of great numerical superiority).

In 1966, the American Standards Association (ASA) released K100.1-1966, "Safety Code and Requirements for Dry Martinis", a tongue-in-cheek account of how to make a "standard" dry martini. The latest revision of this document, K100.1-1974, was published by American National Standards Institute (ANSI), the successor to ASA, though it is no longer an active standard.

Origins and mixology
The exact origin of the martini is unclear. The name may derive from the Martini brand of vermouth. Another popular theory suggests it evolved from a cocktail called the Martinez served sometime in the early 1860s at the Occidental Hotel in San Francisco, which people frequented before taking an evening ferry to the nearby town of Martinez, California. Alternatively, residents of Martinez say a bartender in their town created the drink, while another source indicates that the drink was named after the town. Indeed, a "Martinez Cocktail" was first described in Jerry Thomas's 1887 edition of his Bartender's Guide, How to Mix All Kinds of Plain and Fancy Drinks:

Other bartending guides of the late 19th century contained recipes for numerous cocktails similar to the modern-day martini. For example, Harry Johnson's Bartenders' Manual (1888) listed a recipe for a "Martini Cocktail" that consisted in part of half a wine glass of Old Tom gin and a half a wine glass of vermouth.

The "Marguerite Cocktail", first described in 1904, could be considered an early form of the dry martini, because it was a 2:1 mix of Plymouth dry gin and dry vermouth, with a dash of orange bitters.

In his 1907 bartenders' guide The World's Drinks And How To Mix Them, San Francisco mixologist  William Boothby provided possibly the earliest recipe for a "Dry Martini Cocktail" not only resembling a modern day martini in the ingredients, but also under that name. Attributing it to one Charlie Shaw of Los Angeles, Boothby's book gave the recipe as follows:

The first dry martini is sometimes linked to the name of a bartender who concocted the drink at the Knickerbocker Hotel in New York City in 1911 or 1912.

During Prohibition in the United States (1920–1933) the relative ease of illegal gin manufacture led to the martini's rise as the locally predominant cocktail. With the repeal of Prohibition, and the ready availability of quality gin, the drink became progressively drier. In the 1970s and 1980s, the martini came to be seen as old-fashioned and was replaced by more intricate cocktails and wine spritzers, but the mid-1990s saw a resurgence in the drink and numerous new versions.

Variations 
The traditional martini comes in a number of variations.

A perfect martini uses equal amounts of sweet and dry vermouth.

Luis Buñuel used the dry martini as part of his creative process, regularly using it to sustain "a reverie in a bar". He offers his own recipe, involving Angostura bitters, in his memoir.

The Churchill martini uses no vermouth, and should be prepared with gin straight from the freezer while glancing at a closed bottle of dry vermouth, or with a sly bow in the direction of France.

A wet martini contains more vermouth; a 50-50 martini uses equal amounts of gin and vermouth. An upside-down or reverse martini has more vermouth than gin.

A dirty martini contains a splash of olive brine or olive juice and is typically garnished with an olive.

A martini may also be served on the rocks—that is, with the ingredients poured over ice cubes and served in an old fashioned glass.

A Gibson is a standard dry martini garnished with cocktail onions instead of olives.

The Yale Cocktail is a 6:1 martini with equal parts vermouth and either crème de violette or Creme Yvette, which impart a blue color, and Angostura bitters.

Vodka martini
A vodka martini is a cocktail made with vodka and vermouth, a variation of a martini. A vodka martini is made by combining vodka, dry vermouth and ice in a cocktail shaker or mixing glass. The ingredients are chilled, either by stirring or shaking, then strained and served "straight up" (without ice) in a chilled cocktail glass.  The drink may be garnished with an olive, a "twist" (a strip of lemon peel squeezed or twisted), capers, or cocktail onions (with the onion garnish specifically yielding a vodka Gibson).

False variations 
Sometimes the term "martini" is used to refer to other mostly-hard-liquor cocktails such as Manhattan, Cosmopolitan, and ad hoc or local  concoctions whose only commonality with the drink is the cocktail glass in which they are served. There is some debate as to whether or not these are true martinis. Chefs with a more whimsical bent are even producing dessert martinis which are not a drink at all, but are merely served in martini glasses.

Some newer drinks include the word "martini" or the suffix "-tini" in the name (e.g., appletini, peach martini, chocolate martini, breakfast martini). These are so named because they are served in a cocktail glass. Generally containing vodka, they have little in common with the martini. A porn star martini is a variation of a vodka martini. The vodka is vanilla flavored, and is served with passion fruit juice, accompanied by a shot of Prosecco.

Another popular form is the espresso martini, made in restaurants as a dessert. Many variations exist but most involve shaking espresso coffee with vodka, coffee liqueur, and sugar syrup; serving in a chilled martini glass. Shaking a fresh espresso shot creates a hard layer of crema which is garnished with three coffee beans in the centre.

Other false variations include:
 Bacon martini
 China martini, which is actually a flavour variant of Amaro
 French martini
 Mexican martini
 Saketini
 Vesper, also called a Vesper martini

In creative works
The fictional British Secret Service agent James Bond is famously known for ordering a "vodka martini, shaken, not stirred".
 The phrase first appears, yet without the specification for "vodka", in the fourth book of the Bond novel series by Ian Fleming in Diamonds Are Forever (1956), but the Bond character is not the one that says it.
 A variation of the phrase is uttered by the villain Dr. Julius No, in the first Bond film, Dr. No (1962), but again, Bond is not the character who says it.
 In Casino Royale, Fleming invented the Vesper martini, with gin, vodka, and Kina Lillet.
 It was first uttered by the Bond character himself (Sean Connery), in its entirety, in the third Bond film, Goldfinger (1964).
On the American television show I Dream of Jeannie, Jeannie makes vodka martini gush from a rock in the desert for Captain Nelson, calling it his "favorite potion" (though at the time he needed water).
On the American sitcom, M*A*S*H, the main character Benjamin "Hawkeye" Pierce, has a gin distillery in his tent, which he uses to make martinis, in almost every episode.

See also 
 Bronx
 Dryness
 Gibson
 List of cocktails
 Three-martini lunch
 Vesper

References

External links 

 

Cocktails with gin
Cocktails with vermouth
Cocktails with vodka

Italian alcoholic drinks
Spirit-forward cocktails
Three-ingredient cocktails